Trichophiala is a monotypic moth genus in the family Eupterotidae. It was described by Per Olof Christopher Aurivillius in 1879. Its only species, Trichophiala devylderi, was described by the same author in the same year. It is found in Namibia.

References

Endemic fauna of Namibia
Moths described in 1879
Eupterotinae
Monotypic moth genera
Moths of Africa